Lehnsherr is a type of feudal lord.

It may also refer to several fictional characters:

 Erik Lehnsherr, aka Magneto
 Edie Lehnsherr
 Magnus Lehnsherr
 Charles Lehnsherr